Jangajji or pickled vegetables is a type of banchan (side dish) made by pickling vegetables. Unlike kimchi, jangajji is non-fermented vegetables, usually pickled in soy sauce, soybean paste, or chili paste. Jangajji dishes are usually preserved for a long period of time, and served with a drizzle of sesame oil. Preserved foods like jangajji were developed to attain a certain level of vegetable consumption during the long, harsh winters on the Korean peninsula.

Etymology 

Jangajji is derived from Middle Korean jyangaetdihi, that consists of the noun jyang ("soy sauce" or "soybean paste"), the genitive postposition -ae (-), the inserted inter-siot -t- (--), and the noun dihi ("kimchi").

Ingredients 
Main ingredients vary according to region and temperature. Some examples are green garlic, garlic scapes, radish, cucumber, chili pepper leaves, chamoe, perilla leaves, and deodeok. Jangajji is usually pickled in soy sauce, soybean paste, or chili paste, but brine and diluted vinegar can also be used as the pickling liquid. Usually, vegetables are slightly dried or salted to prevent the addition of surplus moisture to the condiment. When served, jangajji is cut, then seasoned with sesame oil, sugar, and toasted sesame seed powder.

Varieties 
 boksa-jangajji – pickled peach
 buchu-jangajji – pickled garlic chives
 chamoe-jangajji – pickled Korean melon
 cheoncho-jangajji – pickled chopi fruits
 doraji-jangajji – pickled balloon flower roots
 gaji-jangajji – pickled eggplants
 kkaennip-jangajji – pickled perilla leaves
 maneul-jong-jangajji – pickled garlic, both garlic scapes and cloves
 meowi-jangajji – pickled butterbur leaves
 mu-jangajji – pickled Korean radish
 mu-mallaengi-jangajji – pickled dried radish
 oi-jangajji – pickled cucumber
 pa-jangajji – pickled scallions
 put-gochu-jangajji – pickled green chili peppers
 put-maneul-jangajji – pickled green garlic
 saenggang-jangajji – pickled ginger
 sancho-jangajji – pickled prickly ash fruits
 umu-jangajji – pickled agar jelly
 yeolmu-jangajji – pickled young summer radish

Gallery

See also

References

External links 

Banchan
Pickles